Jonathan Blow (born 1971) is an American video game designer and programmer. He is best known for his work on the independent video games Braid (2008) and The Witness (2016).

Born in California, Blow developed a passion for game programming during middle school and pursued a double degree in computer science and English at the University of California, Berkeley. After dropping out of college he started a game company with a friend, and worked as a game development contractor after the company closed with the dot-com crash. He co-founded the Experimental Gameplay Workshop and wrote a technical monthly column for Game Developer magazine before gaining prominence in 2008 with Braid.

He used the financial success of Braid to fund his next game, The Witness, and formed the company Thekla Inc in the process. After a lengthy development period, the game was released in 2016 and was critically and financially successful. During its development, Blow began designing and creating a new programming language after being frustrated with C++, the language Thekla used to program the game. Full-time work on the language, codenamed Jai, and a new game implemented in it began after the release of The Witness. The language is currently in closed beta, and in December 2021 its compiler reached beta version 100.

Blow's games are known for being artistic and challenging. They are also made with custom game engines, and have larger budgets and development times than most independently funded games. In addition to his work on his games and his feature in Indie Game: The Movie, he is also known for having strong opinions about the gaming industry, and critiques trends he finds unethical or believes hinder the medium from reaching its potential.

Early life

Jonathan Blow was born in Southern California in 1971. His father worked as a defense contractor for TRW, and his mother was an ex-nun. He is the fourth of five children born to the couple, having two brothers and two sisters. He was raised Christian, Blow noting "we went to church every Sunday". Blow attended middle school in Northern San Diego County. While there, he attended a fifth or sixth-grade computer class with Commodore VIC-20s which provided him with his first introduction to programming and computers. Blow said "That was my favorite thing at school. I got it right away." When his parents noticed that he was very interested in computers, they got him a TRS-80 Color Computer, on which Blow learned how to program in BASIC, often using exercise books from RadioShack. In high school he also programmed games on a Commodore 64. Some of the games he programmed were inspired by Indiana Jones and Pac-Man.

Blow attended UC Berkeley as an undergraduate in 1989, double-majoring in computer science and English. He started as a physics major, but switched to computer science because he "just felt called in that direction". Blow said that of the computer science major "you had to know what you were doing", while the bachelor's degree in English was "all about bullshitting things". He was a member, and president, of the Computer Science Undergraduate Association, as well as the eXperimental Computing Facility (XCF), an undergraduate computer-interest organization. Blow said he wrote some science fiction during college, but published it under a pseudonym. He spent five years at UC Berkeley, but dropped out with less than one semester to go. When asked about why he left, Blow said "I was really depressed about being at school, I didn't like it. I didn't have a good time."

Career

19942000: Career beginnings and Wulfram
After leaving UC Berkeley, Blow worked at a "really boring" enterprise software company for six months, before taking up a contracting role at Silicon Graphics. There he ported Doom and Doom II to a set-top box. In early 1996 Blow started the game company Bolt-Action Software in Oakland with Bernt Habermeier, whom Blow had met in the XCF at UC Berkeley. An artist joined the team later, and together they created Wulfram, a 3D action-strategy game for up to 32 players.

In Wulfram, players took control of a heavily armed hovertank, and joined one of two sides with the aim to force the other side off the map. The standard map size was around 31 km2. In a February 1998 interview, Blow said the game was around 150,000 lines of C++ code, 2500 of which were assembly for texture mapping optimization, and the game ran on Windows 95, Windows NT, Linux, and Solaris. Scott Keur of MPOGD reviewed the game while it was in closed beta, praised its graphics, gameplay, lack of lag, but criticized its sound, and called it "the best combined action/strategy game to date". Wulfram was released in open beta in July 1998 and free to play on Total Entertainment Network. TEN shut down slightly more than a year later, however, after which Blow brought the game to Interactive Magic.

Bolt-Action Software became as large as 14 employees, but it folded in 2000 due to the dot-com crash. The name Wulfram went through several name changes, the final of which was Wulfram 2. For a while after Bolt Action Software folded,  Habermeier ran the final version of the game for free on the internet. In a 2020 interview, Blow said he was convinced that 1996 was the hardest time in history to start a video game company, because of the transition from 2D to 3D titles. A number of components of the game were challenging to implement, but Blow learned a lot from the experience. He summarized "we went broke, and I was burned out for several years after that from working hard... but that's how I became a good programmer."

20012004: Contracting work

After Blow closed his first studio, he did contracting work with a number of game studios with larger budgets. Games he worked on included Oddworld: Munch's Oddysee, Deus Ex: Invisible War and Thief: Deadly Shadows. In 2002, together with Chris Hecker, Doug Church and Robin Hunicke, Blow co-founded the experimental gameplay workshop at the Game Developers Conference. Around this time, he also wrote The Inner Product, a monthly column for magazine Game Developer.

During this time period, Blow moved to New York City where he was introduced to an IBM research project about servers based on cell processors, which IBM had partly developed. Blow pitched them a proof of concept of a physics-intensive online multiplayer game about giant robots attacking a town. In the game, physics simulation was done on the server. The movement of robots was not implemented with animations but by applying forces to their joints. Players could shoot these joints and thereby affect the movement of the robots. Blow and Atman Binstock did most of the programming for the game, Blow writing the client-side code, graphics, and gameplay, while Binstock wrote the physics engine to run on the server from scratch. After submitting their final report to IBM, the team tried to bring the game to Electronic Arts, but Blow said, "they were like, 'Yeah, we're not impressed'".

Further contract work Blow did included: particle effect programming on Flow on the PS3 (which used the cell processor); code review when MTV purchased Harmonix; programming on the dynamic music-action iPod game Phase. Blow said of this part of his life "I didn't really know what I was doing in life yet, I was just stumbling forward like people do sometimes, and doing the best that I knew how to do, which at that time was programming."

20052008: Braid

The 2D puzzle-platformer Braid (2008) was a landmark of independent game development. Released on the Xbox 360 through Xbox Live Arcade (XBLA), the game was "an immediate sensation", and a critical and commercial success. Braid demonstrated that it was possible for indie developers to release games on storefronts (instead of through publishers) and remain financially successful. The game "is often credited as the catalyst for the indie [game] boom of the following years".

In Braid, the player solves puzzles using a combination of platforming gameplay and the ability to rewind time. The precise mechanism of time rewind changes throughout the course of the game, and it is usually an essential part of any puzzle solution. For the game's story, Blow drew inspiration from a variety of his favourite books and films such as Invisible Cities and Mulholland Drive, and the plot is told through a combination of textual exposition between worlds, environmental art, and gameplay. The story initially appears to be about the protagonist searching for a princess, but Blow stated that the narrative was "big and subtle and resists being looked at directly."

Blow created a prototype for Braid in December 2004, and began work on the game proper five months later. Much of the work was part-time as Blow also did consulting work for a stable income and invested time into martial-arts training. By December 2005 Blow had finished the first version of the game; however, he felt the graphics and artstyle "looked extremely amateur". After many "false starts" trying to find a good artist, he hired David Hellman, who would eventually create all of the game's art. In mid 2007 he signed with Microsoft to release the game XBLA. Blow felt that time spent meeting the XBLA certification process would have been better spent polishing the game, but he noted that Microsoft was "very hands-off" with respect to game design, and that "the final game is exactly what I wanted to put there". Blow estimated that he spent more than $180,000 of his own money to develop Braid.

The game was released digitally in August 2008 to universal acclaim, and made Blow a millionaire. Available only through download, the game represented an early shift in video games from physical to digital stores. The success of the game inspired many other indie developers; in particular, a designer at Supergiant Games claimed the studio wouldn't exist without the success of Braid. By 2010 some other indie games had also found commercial success, leading Blow to cofound Indie Fund in 2010. Blow was featured in the documentary film Indie Game: The Movie, where he discusses his experiences developing and releasing Braid. In 2014 Blow stated that sales had brought in more than $4 million in revenue, which he used to fund The Witness.

20092016: The Witness

Blow's next project was The Witness (2016), a first-person game in which the player explores an island while solving a large variety of puzzles on panels. The panel puzzles require the player to draw a path on the panel, and are solved if the path satisfies a number of rules. Blow wanted to create a game utilizing non-verbal communication, and as such, the puzzle rules are never explained with words. Instead, the puzzles themselves teach the player the rules. Blow felt that solving puzzles in this way could generate epiphanies for players, and tried to design the game so that the player experiences "miniature epiphanies over and over again". Blow estimated that solving every puzzle in the game would take more than 80 hours.

Work on The Witness began shortly after the release of Braid in 2008. Blow created prototypes of several different game ideas before choosing the one he liked the most, despite it being a 3D game which he "absolutely didn't want to do". Throughout development, Blow hired people to work on the game full-time, forming the company Thekla, Inc. in the process (he remains its president). By the time the game was revealed to the public in 2010, three people were working on the game full-time, and by 2015 this number had grown to eight. Blow had hoped to release the game as a launch title for the PS4 in 2013, however, work on the game continued until its release in 2016. At the time, it was virtually unheard of for a small independent game studio to spend more than seven years on a game. Blow said that The Witness ended up being "a much bigger game than I thought", and that "as long as it looked like we were going to have the money and time... we decided to make it the best thing we can."

The game was released on Windows and the PlayStation 4 in January 2016 to critical acclaim and commercial success.  It debuted at $39.99, a price point that was met with outcry in some gaming forums. Blow stated that the price point was "fairly reflective of what the game is", and journalists noted that other independent games of a similar scope and quality debuted with the same price. Blow reported that the first week sales revenue of The Witness totaled over US$5 million, and that it had sold more than 100,000 units. After release, Blow said that The Witness was one of the top downloads on illegal BitTorrent websites, was pirated "just as heavily" as Braid, and noted that pirating the game does not help fund Thekla's next game." The game received several BAFTA and Game Developers Choice Awards nominations, and appeared on 'Best of the decade' features from IGN, Polygon, NME, CNET, and National Post.

2017present: Jai Programming Language, untitled sokoban game, and Braid, Anniversary Edition

Towards the end of development of The Witness, Blow became frustrated with C++, the programming language Thekla used to implement the game's engine. Blow considered the language to be fiendishly complex, noting "C++ is a powerful language in some ways... but it makes [software development] a lot harder than it should be." He looked into the de facto alternatives to C++ at the time (namely Go, D, and Rust), but found none that addressed his concerns. He then released some videos on YouTube where he tried to convince people that game developers "could do better than get off C++." Blow estimated that a new programming language designed for game development could reduce typical development time by at least 20% and advance the art form by making programming more enjoyable. Further, he anticipated that the language would be relatively easy to create compared to creating a game like The Witness.

In 2014, Blow began work on designing and programming the new language, which is codenamed Jai. Among other things, Blow hopes the language will improve the experience of game programming and allow programmers to build more functionality with less code. When asked about the real name of the language in 2020, Blow quipped that for many projects "people put all their effort into the cool name" before working on the project itself, and that he was "doing things in the opposite way". For about the first year and a half, his work on Jai was part time as Thekla was busy shipping The Witness. Full-time work on Jai began in mid-2016, as well as a game engine written in Jai and a sokoban game built in that engine. By working on the sokoban game, its engine, and Jai at the same time, Blow is able to test the language's design and adjust it early in its lifetime.

Blow has noted that no previous programming languages have debuted with a piece of demo software as large and complex as a game. The game is intended to prove the capability of the language, thus reducing the risk associated with adopting Jai upon release. During a 2018 conference talk, Blow demonstrated that a clean non-optimized compilation of the 80,000-line sokoban game took less than two seconds on his laptop. He predicted that with additional work the compilation rate would increase significantly, with a target compilation rate of a million lines of Jai per second (for a clean non-optimized build). In July 2018 Blow felt the language had already improved his productivity by 15%, and thought that given time this could increase to 50–80%. Blow intends to release much of the source code of the sokoban game upon release, and said Thekla is trying to structure the code to be "very malleable" so that upon release it can "provide an in for people who actually want to start experimenting with a program." The Jai compiler is currently in closed beta and reached beta version 100 in December 2021.

The Jai-based sokoban game combines puzzle elements from a variety of other sokoban games while adding ideas of its own. The majority of characters from Jonah Ostroff's Heroes of Sokoban trilogy appear in the game, as do the lily pads and skipping stones from Alan Hazelden's Skipping Stones To Lonely Homes. By combining so many puzzle elements together, Thekla is able to "explode out the combinatorics [of the puzzle space] even further than Thekla did with The Witness." In mid 2018, two programmers were working on the game, and the art team consisted of five people. The sokoban game had over 700 levels as of May 2021, and Blow stated that it will probably have more than 1000 upon release. Work on the sokoban game, its engine, and Jai are regularly streamed by Blow on his twitch channel.

In August 2020, Thekla announced Braid, Anniversary Edition, a remastered edition of Braid. The game's art is being repainted with significantly more detail, and will have smoother animations and enhanced sound. The new edition will include detailed and thorough developer commentary from Blow. Players will be able to toggle between the original and upgraded version while playing. Blow explained that the remaster will be faithful to the original, remarking that Braid will not get the "Greedo shoots first" treatment (a reference to a change made to Star Wars). Thekla planned to launch the game in early 2021.

Long-term project
In 2013 Blow began making a prototype for a singleplayer game that was not a puzzle game. In 2018 Blow said the game had 40–50 hours of playable gameplay. He intends for Thekla to make the game using the game engine being developed for the sokoban game, once it has matured. He plans to work on the game over the course of 20 years, releasing the game in installments. Each installment will make the game larger and add complexity.

Blow noted that one of his goals for the project is to expand his design abilities, and stated "I want to design something that is out of my comfort zone that will make me [a better designer]." Another goal is for the game to be similar to Gravity's Rainbow in having a "high dynamic range" and in how the work "is not afraid to leave you behind when it flies. It expects you to do some work and come with it".

Artistry
In his youth, Blow liked playing text adventure games by Infocom. His favorite was Trinity, which Blow said "affected me in a relatively deep way in terms of the way that I think about games." In college, his favorite game was Netrek. Early in his career Blow played a lot of Counter-Strike, and said that the game “taught [him] a lot of subtle things.”

Blow's games are known for being artistic and not following industry trends, as well as being challenging. In a retrospective on Braid, GQ noted that the game was released at a time when the market was dominated by violent and repetitive first-person shooters, yet "made an earnest effort to make an artistic statement" that went beyond this trend. Time described The Witness as "categorically defiant", and described its reception as being "widely quantified as a game created by a genius for geniuses". The puzzles of Braid have been described as "tough" and "formidable".

Blow's games have higher budgets and longer development times than most independently funded games, and have custom game engines. Braid was built with an relatively large budget for independent games at the time, while The Witness — largely funded with the profits of Braid — cost close to six million dollars. The development times for Braid and The Witness were highly unusual for independent games at the time. The choice to create a custom game engine for both games was due to Blow wanting full control over every aspect of the game, and ensuring he could provide the game decades into the future. Braid artist David Hellman said that that Blow was not stressed about time or budget, and that for him "the game always came first."

Blow said that when he makes a game, he tries to make something that he would want to play and be interested in. He has a desire to understand the world from many directions, and tries to uncover and understand true things about the universe through game design. Blow has a love of exploring the permutations of a simple idea. He described an ideal player of his games as approximately being someone who "is inquisitive and likes to be treated as an intelligent person." Blow hoped the design skills he developed by working on complicated games have made Jai better designed than most languages.

Blow said that he built Thekla not out of any aspiration goal to run a company, but a necessary consequence of wanting creative freedom. He used almost all of the profits of Braid to independently fund The Witness, noting "I was willing to put it all in the poker pot and make the thing I wanted to make, without interference."  He has described his direction as being like a "benevolent dictator" who decides what the game is and makes sure that other people's ideas "work with the large vision." Blow doesn't schedule development time for games at Thekla, noting "we don't do it like Electronic Arts. We don't pick a quarter and ship the game. We're just trying to make the best game."

Public image
In addition to having a reputation for doing outstanding work, Blow is also known for voicing his opinions about the gaming industry. He has been described as a "prickly genius" and the game industry's "most cerebral developer, but also as its most incisive and polarizing internal critic". Commenting on his criticism, Blow said "I honestly say what I think about games, and I honestly say if I think something is good or not, and why." Stephen Totilo of Kotaku thought that Blow's criticism is not targeted towards individuals or specific games but industry trends.

Blow often identifies trends in games which he thinks do not strengthen the medium, hold it back from reaching its potential, or are unethical. Blow thinks that there are individual elements of storytelling which work well in games, including mood, character and setting, but considers games to be a terrible medium for storytelling in general. As of 2016, he considered the quality of storytelling in games to be significantly lower than literature. In 2018 he thought that many contemporary games included designs which are self-sabotaging and weaken the structure of whatever game they are in, despite such designs existing nearly a decade earlier, indicating a stall in progress.  He doesn't consider microtransactions to be inherently unethical, but thinks that many games made for phones are "just pretending to be games in order to have a microtransaction button or show ads". He considers social network games evil, and noted than while SimCity and FarmVille may appear similar from a distance, SimCity is a creative activity that involves problem solving while FarmVille is just about getting the player to sit in front of the screen for as long as possible.

Blow feels that games have the potential have a much bigger role culturally and "heavily impact the patterns of human thought, and help define what it means to be human". While Blow strives to make his games meaningful, he has noted that games with relatively empty gameplay (such as MMOs) which keep players hooked with fake rewards may be causing real harm to people.

Despite being seen as somewhat of a poster child for independent development, Blow is uncomfortable with being described as an indie developer: he feels that the indie game scene has changed into something in which he does not belong. In 2019 he felt that the scene had developed in the sense that it was easier to make and release a independent game than ever before, but "if you're talking about progress in exploring the medium, I think the progress has not been as large as people assume." Blow noted that Stephen's Sausage Roll, a game he thought in 2017 "may be the best puzzle of all time", was rarely talked about in development circles, indicating a stagnation of the development scene. The comments attracted social media attention, which Blow found troubling, noting "most of the people who got mad are not people who successfully have created indie games. I worry about that. I'm just trying to give people the best advice, that's all."

Blow considers technology to be more aggravating than it has ever been. He noted in particular that contemporary phones have processing powers and memories comparable to supercomputers from the 1990s, yet it is common to encounter lag on phone apps when performing simple actions such as scrolling or pressing buttons that should be near-instantaneous. He noted "it's like software is worse now than it's ever been." He has a low opinion of modern C++, describing C++ in 2020 as "a terrible, terrible, language at this point". Part of his motivation for making an alternate systems-level programming language to C++ was to try create a tool which was not aggravating to use, and which enables the creation of high quality game engines. "It was me wanting to make my life better and make other people's lives better."

Works

Video games 
Only games where Blow has had a major role in development are included below. For example, works in which he is credited under Special Thanks are omitted.

Films

Notes

References

Citations

Sources

External links

 
 
 

1971 births
American computer programmers
American video game designers
American video game programmers
Indie video game developers
Living people
People from San Francisco
University of California, Berkeley alumni
Video game writers